Force Majeure is the debut solo studio album by German singer Doro, released in February 1989 by Vertigo Records.

Background
After the success of Warlock's album Triumph and Agony, which gained Gold status in Germany and reached number 98 on the Billboard 200 in the United States, Doro remained the only original member of the band. Some legal issues about the use of the name Warlock were raised by the former band manager and Doro settled the dispute, renouncing to issue any new album with the band's name, but using her name instead for any new releases. However, the first print of the LP was issued with a sticker on the cover near Doro's name with "+ Warlock" written on and for some fans Force Majeure should still be considered as the last album by Warlock.

Just like Triumph and Agony, the album was recorded in the US and produced by Joey Balin. Bass player Tommy Henriksen, who was part of the last line-up of Warlock plays in this album, too. The line-up is completed by drummer Bobby Rondinelli (Rainbow, Scorpions, Quiet Riot, Black Sabbath, Blue Öyster Cult,) and guitarist Jon Levin, whose name was incorrectly reported as Jon Devin on the album sleeve.

Trying to follow the positive American feedback of the previous Warlock album, the songs of Force Majeure are even more oriented to radio-friendly glam metal than to the European power metal of Doro's earlier works and include for the first time a cover, Procol Harum's famous "A Whiter Shade of Pale".
The album sold quite well in Europe but had a limited success in the US, reaching number 154 on the Billboard 200.

Critical reception
Billboard reviewer described the music of this work as "metal rock with Pesch's intriguing voice surrounded by screaming guitars and pounding drums" and expressed an opinion that she could gain a lot of new fans with a little help from MTV and a good spot on a tour.

Track listing

Personnel
Band members
 Doro Pesch – vocals
 Jon Levin – guitars 
 Tommy Henriksen – bass, backing vocals
 Bobby Rondinelli – drums

Additional musicians
 Claude Schnell – keyboards

Production
 Joey Balin – producer, all arrangements
 Jeff Hendrickson – engineer, mixing
 Dominick Maita – engineer
 Brooke Hendricks, Brian Stover, Michael White – assistant engineers
 Greg Calbi – mastering

Charts

Weekly charts

Year-end charts

References

External links
 American site
 "A Whiter Shade of Pale" video clip
 "Hard Times" video clip

1989 debut albums
Doro (musician) albums
Vertigo Records albums